Sandra Elisa Moya Torres-Cablayan (born February 14, 1974) is a retired female track and field athlete, who competed in the sprints events during her career.

She represented her native country at the 2000 Summer Olympics, where she was eliminated in the first round of the women's 4x400 metres relay competition, alongside Militza Castro, Beatriz Cruz and Maritza Salas. Moya ran the second leg in the heat 2 race.

International competitions

References

sports-reference

1974 births
Living people
Puerto Rican female sprinters
Athletes (track and field) at the 2000 Summer Olympics
Athletes (track and field) at the 2003 Pan American Games
Olympic track and field athletes of Puerto Rico
Pan American Games competitors for Puerto Rico
Central American and Caribbean Games silver medalists for Puerto Rico
Competitors at the 2002 Central American and Caribbean Games
Central American and Caribbean Games medalists in athletics
21st-century Puerto Rican women